Nguyễn Sáng (1923, in Tien Giang Province – 1988, in Ho Chi Minh City) was a Vietnamese painter. He was a graduate of the 1940–1945 class of the Ecole des Beaux-Arts de l'Indochine. His favorite medias were pumice lacquer and oil paint. Although not overtly political, Sáng was reluctant and unenthusiastic about the new communist society in his paintings. He was posthumously awarded the Ho Chi Minh Prize in 1996.

Works
 Self-portrait, 1956
 Portrait of Painter Duong Bich Lien, 1964
Some of his works are in the Vietnam National Museum of Fine Arts, Hanoi.

References

1923 births
1988 deaths
People from Tiền Giang province
20th-century Vietnamese painters
Ho Chi Minh Prize recipients